Hat Island may refer to:

 Sombrero, Anguilla (also known as "Hat Island"), the northernmost island of the Lesser Antilles 
 Gedney Island (Washington) (also known as "Hat Island"), an island in Possession Sound, part of Puget Sound, Washington, US
 Hat Island, Washington, a census-designated place in Snohomish County that is coterminous with Gedney Island
 Hat Island (Lake Michigan), located in eastern St. James Township, Charlevoix County, Michigan, US
 Putulik formerly Hat Island, in the Kitikmeot Region, Nunavut, Canada
 Hat Island (Sverdrup Islands), in the Qikiqtaaluk Region, Nunavut, Canada
 Cocked Hat Island, Nunavut, Canada
 Vatu Vara, Fiji
 Eretoka Island, Vanuatu